Astegopteryx insularis, is an aphid in the superfamily Aphidoidea in the order Hemiptera. It’s a true bug that sucks sap from plants.

References 

 http://animaldiversity.org/accounts/Astegopteryx_insularis/classification/
 http://www.nbair.res.in/Aphids/Astegopteryx-insularis.php
 https://www.gbif.org/species/4384453
 https://web.archive.org/web/20150402134300/http://digiins.tari.gov.tw/tarie/collection013E.php?id=Arumizu-Arakasao,+Palau+Isls.
 http://eurekamag.com/research/022/072/022072868.php

Hormaphidinae
Agricultural pest insects